"Breakaway", by Australian band Big Pig, is a cover of American R&B singer Chuck Jackson's song "I Can't Break Away". Originally released on November 2, 1987, in the United Kingdom, it was released on February 15, 1988, in Australia as the third single from their debut album Bonk. The song, written by Mitchell Bottler and Gary Zekley, is about freedom and fighting against destiny. Like many other Big Pig songs, "Breakaway" features plentiful drums and percussion but no guitars.

The song became the band's most successful single, reaching number one in New Zealand in May 1988. It also reached number eight in their native Australia and managed to chart in North America, reaching number 60 on the US Billboard Hot 100 and number 10 on Canada's RPM Top Singles chart. Its earlier UK release saw the song peak at number 89 on the UK Singles Chart.

In 1989, the song appeared on the soundtrack to the science-fiction comedy film Bill & Ted's Excellent Adventure, also appearing in the film's opening credits.

Track listing
White Label Records 7-inch single
 "Breakaway" – 3:45
 "Hellbent Heaven" – 3:33

White Label Records 12-inch maxi-single
 "Breakaway" (Popper Mix) – 6:02
 "The Bald Dwarf"
 "Breakaway" – 3:30

A&M Records 12-inch maxi single promo
 "Breakaway" (extended version) – 5:43
 "Breakaway" (dub mix) – 5:13
 "Breakaway" (12-inch Popper Mix) – 6:02
 "Breakaway" (new edit) – 3:45

Charts

Chuck Jackson version

Big Pig version

Weekly charts

Year-end charts

Release history

References

External links
 

1973 songs
1987 singles
1988 singles
A&M Records singles
ABC Records singles
Chuck Jackson songs
Mushroom Records singles
Number-one singles in New Zealand
Song recordings produced by Nick Launay
Songs written by Gary Zekley